Events from the year 2012 in France:

Incumbents
 President: Nicolas Sarkozy  (until 16 May), François Hollande (starting 16 May)
 Prime Minister: François Fillon (until 16 May), Jean-Marc Ayrault (starting 16 May)

Events

January
 11 January – French journalist Gilles Jacquier is killed in Homs, Syria after coming under fire whilst reporting the Syrian uprising for France 2. He is the first Western casualty of the conflict.
 13 January – Standard & Poor's downgrades France's credit rating from AAA to AA+.
 23 January – The Senate passes a bill criminalising the denial of the Armenian genocide.

February
 22 February – The term 'mademoiselle' is removed from official documents following a campaign by feminist organisations.
 28 February – The Constitutional Council rules that the bill criminalising denial of the Armenian genocide infringes on freedom of speech, and is therefore unconstitutional. In response, Nicolas Sarkozy orders a redraft of the bill.

April
 April 22 – François Hollande and incumbent Nicolas Sarkozy are selected as second round competitors in the 2012 French presidential election.
 May 6 – François Hollande is elected as the new president of France.
 May 15 – François Hollande is sworn in as president of France; he will serve only one term.

July
 Commission on renewal and ethics in public life is formed by François Hollande on 16 July 2012.

Deaths 

 14 February – Henri-Germain Delauze, 82, engineer and diver, founder of COMEX
 15 February – Jacques Duby, 89, actor
 22 February – Rémi Ochlik, 28, photographer
 25 February – Maurice André, 78, trumpeter (born 1933)
 28 March – Eduard Steinberg, 75, painter (born 1937)
 29 July – Chris Marker, 91, artist (born 1921)

References

Links

2010s in France